Singles is the first greatest hits album by English singer Alison Moyet, released on 22 May 1995 by Columbia Records. The album includes two previously unreleased tracks, Moyet's version of "The First Time Ever I Saw Your Face" and "Solid Wood", as well as a number of hits from the singer's stint in 1980s synth-pop duo Yazoo.

The album was re-released the following year as a two-disc set, Singles/Live, the second disc being a live recording of Moyet on tour, again in 2000 as a one-disc set under the title Best of The Best: Gold and a third time in 2001 as The Essential Alison Moyet with a slightly revised track listing.

Track listing

"The First Time Ever I Saw Your Face"  (Ewan MacColl) – 3:19
 Previously unreleased
"Only You" (Vince Clarke) – 3:12
 Performed by Yazoo, from 1982 album Upstairs at Eric's
"Nobody's Diary" (Moyet) – 4:31
 Performed by Yazoo, from 1983 album You and Me Both
"Situation" (UK Mix) (Vince Clarke, Alison Moyet) – 2:24
 Performed by Yazoo, a 1982 B-side.
 North American editions have instead "Winter Kills" (Moyet), performed by Yazoo, from 1982 album Upstairs at Eric's
"Love Resurrection"  (Steve Jolley, Moyet, Swain) – 3:52
 From 1984 album Alf
"All Cried Out" (7" Edit) (Jolley, Moyet, Swain) – 3:42
 From 1984 album Alf
"Invisible" (Lamont Dozier) – 4:08
 From 1984 album Alf
"That Ole Devil Called Love"  (Doris Fisher, Allan Roberts) – 3:05
 1985 non-album single
"Is This Love?" (Jean Guiot, Moyet) – 4:01
 From 1987 album Raindancing
"Weak in the Presence of Beauty"  (Michael Ward, Robert E. Clarke ) – 3:33
 From 1987 album Raindancing
"Ordinary Girl" (7" Edit) (Bailey, Driscoll, Moyet) – 3:08
 From 1987 album Raindancing
"Love Letters" (Edward Heyman, Victor Young) – 2:51
 1987 non-album single
"It Won't Be Long"  (Pete Glenister, Moyet) – 4:09
 From 1991 album Hoodoo
"Wishing You Were Here"  (Glenister, Moyet) – 3:58
 From 1991 album Hoodoo
"This House" (Moyet) – 3:55
 From 1991 album Hoodoo
"Falling" (Glenister, Moyet) – 3:39
 From 1994 album Essex
"Whispering Your Name" (Single Mix) (Jules Shear) – 3:49
 From 1994 album Essex
"Getting into Something"  (Glenister, Moyet) – 4:15
 From 1994 album Essex
"Ode to Boy II"  (Moyet) – 2:57
 From 1994 album Essex
"Solid Wood" (Moyet) – 4:38
 Previously unreleased

Singles/Live bonus disc (Live)
"Getting into Something" (Glenister, Moyet) – 5:16
"Chain of Fools" (Covay) – 5:05
"Love Letters" (Heyman, Young) – 4:43
"All Cried Out" (Jolley, Moyet, Swain) – 4:08
"Dorothy" (Glenister, Moyet) – 3:24
"Falling" (Glenister, Moyet) – 3:44
"Ode to Boy" (Moyet) – 3:07
"Is This Love?" (Guiot, Moyet) – 3:59
"Nobody's Diary" (Moyet) – 4:30
"Whispering Your Name" (Shear) – 3:53
"There Are Worse Things I Could Do" (Casey, Jacobs) – 3:05
 Recorded at the Royal Albert Hall, London, and The Royal Concert Hall, Glasgow.

Personnel
 Pete Glenister – production 
 Mark Saunders – production 
 Eric Radcliffe – production 
 Yazoo – production 
 Steve Jolley – production 
 Tony Swain – production 
 Pete Wingfield – production 
 Jimmy Iovine – production 
 Manu Guiot – production 
 Steve Brown – production 
 Dave Dix – production 
 Ian Broudie – production

Charts

Weekly charts

Year-end charts

Certifications

References

1995 compilation albums
1996 live albums
Albums produced by Jimmy Iovine
Alison Moyet albums
Columbia Records compilation albums